The 2020 Swedish speedway season was the 2020 season of motorcycle speedway in Sweden.

Individual

Individual Championship
The 2020 Swedish Individual Speedway Championship final was held at the Skrotfrag Arena in Målilla on 23 July 2020.

The title was won by Jacob Thorssell for the second successive season.

U21 Championship
 
Winner - Alexander Woentin

Team

Team Championship
Masarna won the Elitserien.

The Allsvenskan (second tier league) was not held due to the COVID-19 pandemic.

Play offs

References 

Speedway competitions in Sweden
Speedway leagues
Professional sports leagues in Sweden
Swedish
speedway
Seasons in Swedish speedway